Witherslack, Meathop and Ulpha is a civil parish in the South Lakeland district of the English county of Cumbria. It was created following the amalgamation of former civil parishes Witherslack and Meathop and Ulpha on 1 April 2015. In 2011 there was a total population of 653. It includes the villages of Witherslack and Meathop.

See also

Listed buildings in Meathop and Ulpha
Listed buildings in Witherslack

References

External links

 Cumbria County History Trust: Witherslack (nb: provisional research only – see Talk page)
 Cumbria County History Trust: Meathop and Ulpha (nb: provisional research only – see Talk page)
Witherslack, Meathop and Ulpha Community Website

Civil parishes in Cumbria
South Lakeland District